The Turkish Workers and Peasants Socialist Party (TİÇSF) was a socialist party founded in Istanbul on 22 September 1919. Şefik Hüsnü, Ethem Nejat, Ahmet Akif, Sadrettin Celal, Nafi Atuğ Kansu, Cevat Cevdet and Namık İsmail were prominent members. When Istanbul was militarily occupied by Britain and France the party suspended its activities.

Originally the TİÇSF gave support to Kemal Atatürk. They attended the first congress of the Communist Party of Turkey (TKP) held in Baku on 10 September 1920, where the TKP was established.

Further reading 

Communism in History and Theory by Donald F. Busky, Greenwood Press, 2002
Workers and Peasants in the Modern Middle East by Joel Beinin, Cambridge University Press, 2001

References 

Defunct socialist parties in Turkey
Political parties in the Ottoman Empire